= Cyfaill o'r Hen Wlad yn America =

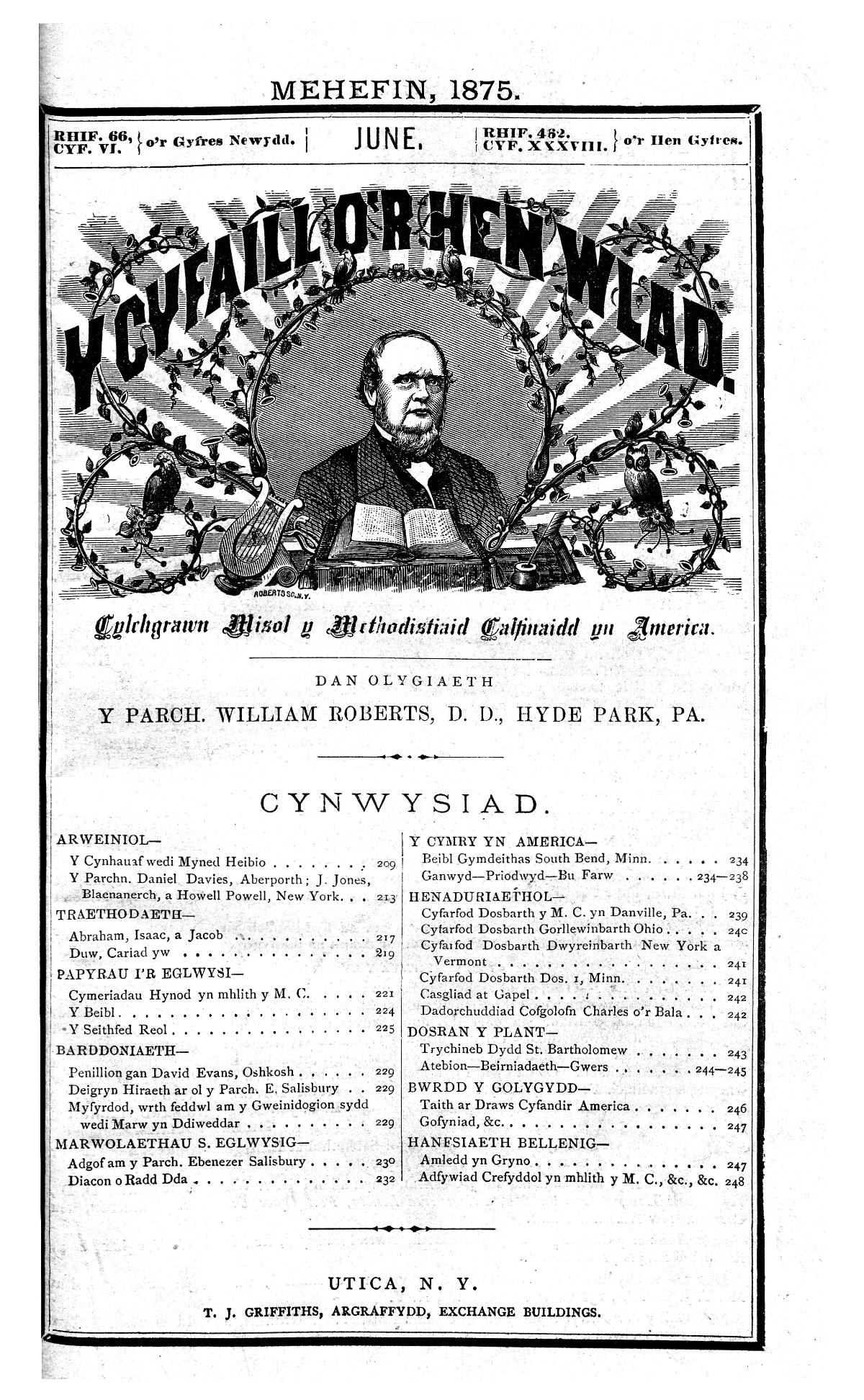
Cyfaill o'r Hen Wlad yn America (Welsh Journal)

The Cyfaill o'r Hen Wlad yn America was a 19th-century monthly Welsh language magazine, first published in New York by William Osborn in 1838. The magazine's editor was Methodist minister William Rowlands, who had emigrated to America, from Wales, in 1836. It contained mainly religious and literary articles and poetry.
